Khaadi (Urdu: کھادی, romanized: Khādī; pronounced [kʰaːd̪iː]) is a Pakistani fashion and lifestyle brand, founded in December 1998.It is headquartered in Karachi.

As of 2015, it operates 46 stores in 17 cities across Pakistan, and 17 stores across the United Kingdom, and the GCC.

History
Khaadi was founded in 1998 by Shamoon Sultan. The first store was opened in Karachi's Zamzama in 1999. Khaadi was originally a handwoven clothing brand. Khaadi expanded to multi-stores, within two years of its inception, and introduced multiple product lines. 

By 2002, it was making women's ready-to-wear items and soon expanded into women's luxury wear with Khaadi Khaas in 2008. In 2012, Khaadi changed to a fast fashion retail brand, when it decided to evolve with the customer and introduce colourful Khaadi fabrics.  

With the launch of Khaadi Kids and Khaadi Home in 2012-2013 and Khaadi Fragrances in 2019, Khaadi became a lifestyle brand.

In 2016, with a revenue of 16 billion, Khaadi became one of the most valuable companies in Pakistan.

Leading architecture firm ASA served as the interior designer for Khaadi stores at Pakistan, UK and UAE until 2017.

In 2020 the company enlisted Landor & Fitch's help in designing The Experience Hub, which opened in December 2021. It is a 32,000 square ft space in Karachi that functions both as a retail space, and as a way to introduce product lines to consumers. The space also has a cafe. 

In 2022 IFC (member of the World Bank Group) became the first investor with an equity of $25 million for a minority stake in Khaadi Corporation. The funding has helped the company accelerate its growth by expanding its retail footprint and online global sales.

International expansion 
In 2010, Khaadi expanded internationally by opening stores in the UAE first in Dubai and later in Abu Dhabi. In 2013 store launches were planned for the UK. 

In 2014, Khaadi opened a 1,630 sq ft store in Bull Ring, Birmingham at Bull Ring shopping centre and other locations include Westfield London and Westfield Stratford City, Birmingham, UK. Company also opened a store in Highcross Leicester, UK in September 2015. A 22,000-square-feet of Khaadi store was opened in September 2015 at Karachi's Dolmen Mall Clifton.

Brand Identity
The word Khaadi is coined from the word Khaddi (pronounced [kʰaːdiː], Khādī), meaning handloom. The fingers in the original logo signified the weavers’ hands and the work that goes into the final product.

Collaborations

Esra Bilgiç X Khaadi

Khaadi appointed Ertugrul Ghazi famed Esra Bilgiç (Khaadi x Esra) as the face of their brand for their first-ever television commercial. Khaadi represented Esra through their fashion as the woman of today.

Khaadi x Coke Studio

Khaadi was the first Pakistani fashion brand in the world to create Coke Studio branded merchandise. The collaboration between Khaadi and Coke Studio was launched on 17 January in Pakistan, U.A.E, and Saudi Arabia.

Khaadi x Allure

Khaadi x Allure by Mehreen Tabani was a jewelry collaboration consisting of a selection of pieces fused with modern and cultural designs.

Khaadi x Esfir

Khaadi x Esfir was a jewelry collaboration offering timeless pieces based on contemporary styles.

References

 
Clothing brands
Pakistani clothing
High fashion brands
Clothing companies established in 1998
Retail companies established in 1998
Clothing brands of Pakistan
Pakistani fashion labels
Companies based in Karachi
Companies based in Lahore
Companies based in Islamabad
Pakistani brands
Lux Style Award winners
Pakistani companies established in 1998
Multinational companies headquartered in Pakistan